Donbas in Flames. Guide to the Conflict Zone is a guidebook devoted to the Russo-Ukrainian War prepared by experts from the Prometheus Center for Security Environment Research with the support of the Canadian Foundation for Local Initiatives. Code according to the UDC classifier 908 (477.61 / .62-074) «2014/...» (036). BBK 26.89 (4Ukr55). The presentation of the book took place on March 17, 2017, at the Ukraine Crisis Media Center in Kyiv.

Annotation 
This publication is the result of work of a group of authors of various competencies: investigative journalism, politology, geography, and history. Written as a kind of vade mecum, this guidebook will familiarize the reader with the precursors, problems, terminology, and characteristics of the war in the Donbas.

The publication contains information useful for journalists, observers, and researchers of the military conflict in eastern Ukraine.

The book is published in the main languages of the OSCE Minsk Group: Ukrainian, English, German, French, Russian. In addition to the print run, all language versions are available for download on the website of the Prometheus Center.

The book is useful for foreign journalists as it contains basic information necessary for work in the anti-terrorist operation zone; it contains many original maps of the conflict zone, both the occupied territory and its non-occupied part. Other background information in the book includes evidence of the Russian Federation's involvement in the war against Ukraine, systematized by the InformNapalm community.

Content 
There are three main blocks in the book:

 Description of Donbas as a region;
 Chronicle of the Russian-Ukrainian armed conflict in Donbas (military actions, occupations, deoccupations);
 A block explaining the hybrid nature of war. It consists of two sections:
 Analysis of information about how the media talk about Donbas, analysis of Russian propaganda;
 Mechanics and evidence of Russian aggression (materials are accompanied by QR-codes, which lead to detailed investigations conducted by OSINT-spies InformNapalm).

The appendices contain a list of decommunized names of settlements in the Donetsk and Luhansk regions, and the international legal qualification of Russia's actions as aggression.

Distribution of the book in Ukraine and abroad 

In 2018, the project leaders summed up the results of the book's distribution in Ukraine and around the world.

The book is distributed free of charge in electronic and printed form. During the year, the electronic version of the book in different languages was downloaded more than 20 thousand times in 82 countries. 10,000 copies of the printed edition were distributed.

Book presentations were held in various cities of Ukraine, as well as in Estonia, Lithuania, Latvia, Germany, Austria, and the United States. The guide was distributed during international events, conferences, round tables in Poland, Slovakia, the Czech Republic, Armenia, Georgia, Belarus, Russia, Serbia, Italy, Germany, France, Qatar, Switzerland, Andorra, Israel, Macedonia, Brazil, and Canada.

The guide was distributed by state bodies of Ukraine: the Office of the Deputy Prime Minister for European and Euro-Atlantic Integration, the Ministry of Foreign Affairs, the Ministry of Defense, the General Staff of the Armed Forces of Ukraine, the Ministry of Information Policy, the National Security and Defense Council, the State Border Service, Parliamentary Committee on National Security and Defense of Ukraine. MPs distributed the guide among their foreign counterparts during the OSCE Parliamentary Assembly in Vienna and Andorra.

Printed copies were received by libraries of Ukrainian and foreign higher education institutions, central libraries of Ukraine, and the Library of Congress.

At the request of the Ministry of Justice of Ukraine, the publication's materials were detailed by the authors and processed according to the procedure as evidence of Russian aggression in Donbas for the European Court of Human Rights in the case «Ukraine v. Russia (V)».

Reviews

References

Sources 

 (ua.)
  (ua.)
  (ru.)

Links 
 Donbas in Flames. Guide to the Conflict Zone / Editor: Alina Maiorova. Authors: Mykola Balaban, Olga Volyanyuk, Christina Dobrovolska, Bohdan Balaban, Maksym Maiorov/ Design: Lukyan Turetsky – Lviv: "Prometheus", 2017. – 98 p. Electronic versions in pdf format ua., eng. deu.. fr. ru.

War in Donbas
Works about the Russo-Ukrainian War
2017 non-fiction books